Willema tsadicus, the northern netted sylph, is a species of butterfly in the family Hesperiidae. It is found in Guinea, north-eastern Nigeria, Cameroon (from the northern part of the country to the Lake Chad area), the Central African Republic, southern Sudan, northern Uganda and south-western Ethiopia.

References

Butterflies described in 1905
Heteropterinae